Lynbrook railway station is located on the Cranbourne line in Victoria, Australia. It serves the south-eastern Melbourne suburb of Lynbrook, and opened on 22 April 2012.

History
Announced as part of the Victorian Transport Plan in 2008, the project was re-announced as part of the Victorian Government's 2010/11 State Budget.

On 9 October 2010, construction works for the station officially commenced, when the then Minister for Public Transport, Martin Pakula, turned the first sod at the site. Completion was expected in 2011 but, due to underbudgeting for the electricity connection to the station, the project stalled, delaying the completion.

Platforms and services
Lynbrook has two side platforms. It is served by Cranbourne line trains.

Platform 1:
  all stations and limited express services to Flinders Street; all stations shuttle services to Dandenong

Platform 2:
  all stations services to Cranbourne

By late 2025, it is planned that trains on the Cranbourne line will be through-routed with those on the Sunbury line, via the new Metro Tunnel.

Transport links
Cranbourne Transit operates three routes to and from Lynbrook station, under contract to Public Transport Victoria:
 : to Dandenong station
 : to Westfield Fountain Gate
 : to Clyde

References

External links
 
 Melway map at street-directory.com.au

Railway stations in Melbourne
Railway stations in Australia opened in 2012
Railway stations in the City of Casey